The 2022 Minnesota House of Representatives election was held in the U.S. state of Minnesota on November 8, 2022, to elect members to the House of Representatives of the 93rd Minnesota Legislature. A primary election was held in several districts on August 9, 2022. The election coincided with the election of the other chamber of the Legislature, the Senate. 

The Minnesota Democratic–Farmer–Labor Party won a majority for a third consecutive election.

Background
As a result of the 2020 election, the DFL maintained control of the House, albeit with a reduced seat majority. Republicans maintained control of the senate, making Minnesota and Alaska the only US states with split control of the legislature. 

Over the past several election cycles, the DFL has lost ground in Iron Range districts to the Republicans. The first sign was in the surprise defeat of long-time DFLer Jim Oberstar to Tea Party Republican Chip Cravaack in the 2010 midterm election, but it was the 2016 and 2020 Presidential elections that saw the largest swings. Iron Range DFL House candidates have narrowly won their seats, but typically by only small margins in districts that used to be safe DFL. For example, DFL Rep. Julie Sandstede of Hibbing was elected by just 30 votes after winning by more than 4,300 votes in 2018. The 5 tossup districts a part of the Iron Range–3A, 3B, 7A, 7B, and 11A–may determine which party controls the chamber.

Electoral system
The 134 members of the House of Representatives will be elected from single-member districts via first-past-the-post voting for two-year terms. Contested nominations of recognized major parties (Democratic-Farmer-Labor, Grassroots-Legalize Cannabis, Legal Marijuana Now, and Republican) for each district will be determined by an open primary election. Minor party and independent candidates will be nominated by petition. Write-in candidates must file a request with the secretary of state's office for votes for them to be counted. The filing period is from May 17, 2022, until May 31, 2022.

Retiring members

DFL 
 Paul Marquart, 4B
 Jennifer Schultz, 7A (running for Minnesota's 8th U.S. Congressional District)
 Mike Sundin, 11A
 Todd Lippert, 20B 
 Liz Boldon, 25B (seeking Senate seat)
 Kelly Morrison, 33B (seeking Senate seat)
 Ami Wazlawik, 38B
 Shelly Christensen, 39B
 Connie Bernardy, 41A
 Ryan Winkler, 46A (running for Hennepin County Attorney)
 Tou Xiong, 53A (seeking Senate seat)
 Steve Sandell, 53B
 Jim Davnie, 63A 
 Rena Moran, 65A (running for Ramsey County Commissioner)
 Carlos Mariani, 65B
 Alice Hausman, 66A

Republican 
 Steve Green, 2B (seeking Senate seat)
 Jordan Rasmusson, 8A (seeking Senate seat)
 John Poston, 9A
 Dale Lueck, 10B
 Tama Theis, 14A (seeking Senate seat)
 Sondra Erickson, 15A
 Tim Miller, 17A
 Glenn Gruenhagen, 18B (seeking Senate seat)
 Barb Haley, 21A (seeking Senate seat)
 Steve Drazkowski, 21B (seeking Senate seat)
 Rod Hamilton, 22B
 Jeremy Munson, 23B (ran for Minnesota's 1st U.S. Congressional District)
 Nels Pierson, 26B (ran for Minnesota's 1st U.S. Congressional District)
 Eric Lucero, 30B (seeking Senate seat)
 Cal Bahr, 31B (seeking Senate seat)
 Bob Dettmer, 39A
 Tony Jurgens, 54B (seeking Senate seat)
 Tony Albright, 55B

Predictions

Results

District results

District 1A
Incumbent Republican John Burkel was first elected in 2020. District 1A is located in northwestern Minnesota covering the northernmost portions of the Red River Valley. Large cities in the district are Roseau, Thief River Falls, and Warren.

District 1B
Incumbent Republican Debra Kiel was first elected in 2010. District 1B is located in northwestern Minnesota and includes East Grand Forks, Crookston, and Red Lake Falls.

District 2A
Incumbent Republican Matt Grossell was first elected in 2016. District 2A is located in northwestern Minnesota, stretching as far south as Bemidji and as far north as the Northwest Angle.

District 2B
Incumbent Republican Matt Bliss was elected in the 2020 election. Bliss previously represented district 5A from 2017-2019, but lost to John Persell by 11 votes in the 2018 election. District 2B is located in north-central Minnesota.

District 3A
Incumbent DFLer Rob Ecklund was first elected in a 2015 special election. District 3A is located in northeastern Minnesota, covering large portions of the Iron Range and the northern Arrowhead Region. Some cities in the 3A district include International Falls, Ely, Silver Bay, Grand Marais. It is the largest house district by area.

District 3B
Incumbent DFLer Mary Murphy was first elected in 1976. She's represented district 3B since 2012. District 3B surrounds the city of Duluth.

District 4A
Incumbent DFLer Heather Keeler was first elected in the 2020 election. District 4A covers most of the city of Moorhead.

District 4B
Incumbent DFLer Paul Marquart, who was first elected in 2000, chose not run for re-election. The district, located in northwestern Minnesota, surrounds the city of Moorhead and includes Glyndon and  Detroit Lakes.

District 5A
District 5A is located in north central Minnesota. The largest city in 5A is Park Rapids.

District 5B
District 5B is the only district in which the Independence Party of Minnesota is fielding a candidate. The district is located in central Minnesota and covers all of Todd County plus portions of  Morrison County,  Cass County, and  Wadena County.

District 6A
District 6A, located in north central Minnesota, stretches from Grand Rapids to Garrison.

District 6B
Incumbent Republican Josh Heintzeman was first elected in 2014. District 6B's largest city is  Brainerd.

District 7A
Newly created district 7A has two incumbents: DFLer Julie Sandstede, first elected in 2016, and Republican Spencer Igo, first elected in 2020.

District 7B
Incumbent DFLer Dave Lislegard was first elected in 2018.

District 8A
Incumbent DFLer Liz Olson was first elected in 2018. District 8A covers the southwestern portion of the city of Duluth.

District 8B
Incumbent DFLer Jennifer Schultz, who was first elected in 2014, is instead running for Minnesota's 8th congressional district.

District 9A
Incumbent Republican Jeff Backer was first elected in 2014.

District 9B

District 10A

District 10B

District 11A

District 11B

District 12A

District 12B

District 13A

District 13B

District 14A

District 14B

District 15A

District 15B

District 16A

District 16B

District 17A

District 17B

District 18A

District 18B

District 19A

District 19B

District 20A

District 20B

District 21A

District 21B

District 22A

District 22B

District 23A

District 23B

District 24A

District 24B

District 25A

District 25B

District 26A

District 26B

District 27A

District 27B

District 28A

District 28B
Incumbent Republican Anne Neu Brindley is running for re-election. District 28B covers the southern portion of Chisago County and includes the cities of Lindström, Chisago City, Stacy, as well as the eastern part of North Branch.

District 29A

District 29B

District 30A

District 30B

District 31A

District 31B

District 32A

District 32B

District 33A

District 33B

District 34A

District 34B

District 35A

District 35B

District 36A

District 36B

District 37A

District 37B

District 38A

District 38B

District 39A

District 39B

District 40A

District 40B

District 41A

District 41B

District 42A

District 42B

District 43A

District 43B

District 44A

District 44B

District 45A

District 45B

District 46A

District 46B

District 47A

District 47B

District 48A

District 48B

District 49A

District 49B

District 50A

District 50B

District 51A

District 51B

District 52A

District 52B

District 53A

District 53B

District 54A

District 54B

District 55A

District 55B

District 56A

District 56B

District 57A

District 57B

District 58A

District 58B

District 59A

District 59B

District 60A
Incumbent Sydney Jordan was first elected in a 2020 special election caused by the death of DFL member Diane Loeffler.

District 60B

District 61A

District 61B

District 62A

District 62B

District 63A

District 63B

District 64A

District 64B

District 65A

District 65B

District 66A 
District 66A includes parts of north eastern Saint Paul as well as Roseville, Falcon Heights, and Lauderdale. Incumbent DFLer Alice Hausman is retiring. Leigh Finke, the DFL endorsed candidate, would become the first transgender member of the Minnesota Legislature if elected.

District 66B
House District 66B covers north central Saint Paul. Incumbent Athena Hollins is running for re-election.

District 67A
District 67A includes the northeast corner of Saint Paul. The incumbent John Thompson failed to secure the DFL endorsement after a string of scandals. He received only 11% of the vote in the primary election, losing to Liz Lee.

District 67B
District 67B covers the easternmost portion of Saint Paul. Incumbent Jay Xiong is running for re-election. He has was first elected in 2018.

See also
 2022 Minnesota Senate election
 2022 Minnesota gubernatorial election
 2022 Minnesota elections

References

External links
 Elections & Voting - Minnesota Secretary of State

2022 Minnesota elections
Minnesota Legislature elections
Minnesota House